Renato Kotnik (born 1 March 1970) is a former Slovene football player, who played as a midfielder. During most of his playing career Kotnik represented Maribor, Korotan and Beltinci in the Slovenian highest division, the Slovenian PrvaLiga, where he has made 172 appearances and scored 20 goals. He has spent the most time in Maribor where he has made 181 competitive appearances for the club and scored 20 goals in the process. During the final years of his career, Kotnik played for amateur clubs in the Austrian football system. In one of those clubs, SV Schwanberg, Kotnik finished his career during the 2006–07 season.

See also
NK Maribor players

References

1970 births
Living people
Yugoslav footballers
Slovenian footballers
Association football midfielders
NK Maribor players
NK Beltinci players